Lucie Trmíková (born 17 July 1969) is a Czech actress. She won the Alfréd Radok Award for Best Actress in 1997 for performing the title role in a production of the play Terezka at the Divadlo Komedie in Prague. She was nominated in the same category at the 2013 awards, but finally lost out to Tereza Vilišová.

References

External links

1969 births
Living people
People from Kolín
Czech television actresses
Czech film actresses
Czech stage actresses
20th-century Czech actresses
21st-century Czech actresses
Recipients of the Thalia Award